Emil Martin (born 27 November 1894, date of death unknown) was a German sports shooter. He competed in the 50 m pistol event at the 1936 Summer Olympics.

References

1894 births
Year of death missing
German male sport shooters
Olympic shooters of Germany
Shooters at the 1936 Summer Olympics
Place of birth missing